José Roger (20 January 1916 – 21 February 1983) was an Argentine sports shooter. He competed in the 25 m pistol event at the 1948 Summer Olympics.

References

External links
 

1916 births
1983 deaths
Argentine male sport shooters
Olympic shooters of Argentina
Shooters at the 1948 Summer Olympics
Sportspeople from Buenos Aires